Ray Corcoran is an Australian former rugby league footballer who played in the 1960s and 1970s.

Playing career
He was a member of the Cronulla-Sutherland club for eight seasons between 1968 and 1975.  His usual position was on the wing. Corcoran's career total of 63 tries is currently the fifth-highest total for the club, and was the highest when he retired in 1975. He was selected to play for New South Wales on one occasion in 1970.

Corcoran played for Cronulla-Sutherland on the wing in the 1973 NSWRFL season's Premiership Final loss against Manly-Warringah.

Post playing
In 2016, Corcoran was nominated for Cronulla's "Team of the half century" but was overlooked in favour of Valentine Holmes and Mat Rogers.

References

External links
 Ray Corcoran at Rugby League Project.
 Ray Corcoran at Rugby League Tables.

Cronulla-Sutherland Sharks players
Rugby league wingers
New South Wales rugby league team players
Living people
Year of birth missing (living people)
Australian rugby league players
Place of birth missing (living people)